Charles Phelps Taft (December 21, 1843 – December 31, 1929) was an American lawyer and politician who served as editor of the Cincinnati Times-Star and owned both the Philadelphia Phillies and Chicago Cubs baseball teams. From 1895 to 1897, he served one term in the  U.S. House of Representatives.

Early life

Taft was born on December 21, 1843, in Cincinnati, Ohio.  He was the eldest child born to Fanny Phelps (1823-1852) and Alphonso Taft (1810–1891).  His father served as the 34th United States Attorney General and 31st United States Secretary of War, both under President Ulysses S. Grant.  Among his younger half-brothers was William Howard Taft (1857–1930), the 27th President of the United States and 10th Chief Justice of the United States, and Horace Dutton Taft (1861–1943), the founder of The Taft School in Watertown, Connecticut, to which he donated $150,000 in 1929.

His maternal grandfather was Judge Charles Phelps, of Townshend, Vermont and his paternal grandparents were Peter Rawson Taft (1785–1867) of the Taft family and Sylvia (née Howard) Taft.  He was the uncle of Robert Alphonso Taft and Charles Phelps Taft II, and the granduncle of Robert Taft Jr.

He was educated at the Phillips Academy in Andover, Massachusetts and graduated from Yale University in 1864, and from Columbia University's law department in 1866.  In 1867, he received another degree from the University of Heidelberg.

Career
Following his graduation from Columbia Law School, he was admitted to the bar and became a partner in the law firm of Sage, Haacke & Taft.  He remained with the firm until he left to study abroad in Germany and France.

After returning from Germany, he resumed the practice of law in 1869 with General Edward F. Noyes, who later served as U.S. Minister to France and the 30th Governor of Ohio, at which point Taft was elected to the Ohio State Legislature.  Ten years later in 1879, he became editor of the Cincinnati Times-Star, which would later be bought by the Cincinnati Post. This began the Taft media empire which was his main claim to fame.

United States Congress
In 1895, he went to Congress as a Republican succeeding Bellamy Storer, but served only two years from March 4, 1895, until March 3, 1897.  He was not a candidate for renomination in 1896 to the Fifty-fifth Congress and his seat was taken by William B. Shattuc.  After retiring from Congress, he returned to the newspaper business.

Taft was a presidential elector in the 1904 presidential election.

Baseball team ownership
In 1905, Taft became a minority owner of the Chicago Cubs when Charles Murphy purchased the club. In 1909, Taft and Murphy funded Horace Fogel's purchase of the Philadelphia Phillies. The pair publicly denied that they had purchased a second club, but did acknowledge that Taft was the owner of Philadelphia's National League Park. After Fogel received a lifetime ban from baseball in 1912, Taft sold the Phillies to William H. Locke. In 1914, Murphy sold his stock in the Cubs to Taft, who named Charles H. Thomas, the secretary under Murphy, as the new club president.  Taft sold the Cubs to Charles Weeghman, with some financial backing from William Wrigley Jr., after the 1915 season. In 1916, Taft sold his interest in West Side Park and National League Park to Murphy.

Personal life

On December 4, 1873, Taft was married to Anna Sinton (1850-1931), who was an heiress to a pig iron fortune, left by her father David Sinton. Together with her husband she began an art collection which she opened to the public from their home. Today their former home is the Taft Museum of Art.

 Jane Taft (1874–1962), who married Albert S. Ingalls the son of railroad executive Melville E. Ingalls in 1929.
 David Sinton Taft (1876–1891)
 Anna Louise Taft Semple (1879–1961)
 Charles Howard Taft (1885–1931).

Taft died on December 31, 1929, in Cincinnati, Ohio, where he was buried at Spring Grove Cemetery.  He left an estate valued at $6,367,374.

Descendants
Through his daughter Jane, he was the grandfather of First World War flying ace David Sinton Ingalls (1899–1985), who married Louise Hale Harkness, daughter of William L. Harkness and granddaughter of Daniel M. Harkness, who was instrumental in the formation of Standard Oil. He was also the grandfather of Anne Taft Ingalls, who married Rupert E. L. Warburton, "a scion of one of England's oldest families," in 1929. His nephew, Charles Phelps Taft II who served as Mayor of Cincinnati, Ohio from 1955 to 1957 was named after him.

Legacy
Following his death, Annie (Anna) Sinton Taft donated $5 million to the University of Cincinnati in 1930 and established a memorial fund after his name.  This fund was transformed in 2005 into the Charles Phelps Taft Research Center at the University of Cincinnati. The city of Taft, Texas was named after him in 1904.

His art collection was said to be the most valuable in the West in 1908. He owned at least two works each of Jean-Baptiste-Camille Corot, Jean-François Millet and Ernest Meissonier, many pieces of fine Chinese porcelain, Portrait of a Man Rising from His Chair by Rembrandt, The Tompkinson Boys by Thomas Gainsborough, and The Cobbler's Apprentice by Frank Duveneck, as well as paintings by Anthony van Dyck, Frans Hals, Jan Steen, Meindert Hobbema, Francisco Goya, Joshua Reynolds and Rousseau.

Sources

External links

Article mentioning him
Piece on him
Taft Research Center at the University of Cincinnati
Finding Aid for Charles Phelps Taft Memorial Fund files, Archives and Rare Books Library, University of Cincinnati, Cincinnati, Ohio
Documenting the Gilded Age: New York City Exhibitions at the Turn of the 20th Century A New York Art Resources Consortium project. Loan exhibition catalog, exhibition catalog, and residence photograph.

1843 births
1929 deaths
Phillips Academy alumni
Taft, Charles Phelps
American people of English descent
Taft, Charles Phelps
Columbia Law School alumni
Taft, Charles Phelps
Heidelberg University alumni
Yale University alumni
Politicians from Cincinnati
Burials at Spring Grove Cemetery
Chicago Cubs owners

Republican Party members of the United States House of Representatives from Ohio
Philadelphia Phillies owners
1904 United States presidential electors